The Expedition of Alqammah bin Mujazziz, took place in September 630 (9 AH, fourth month of the Islamic calendar). This expedition was dispatched to fight against some men from the Kingdom of Aksum, who gathered near the shores of Jeddah. The Ethiopians approached Mecca using boats from the sea, leading some Muslims to flee the area, suspecting the Ethiopians of being pirates.

News reached Muhammad, who sent 'Alqamah bin Mujazziz Al-Mudlaji to the shores of Jeddah, with 300 men. The Muslim fighters crossed the sea until they got to an island. But as soon as the suspected pirates had learned of the Muslims' arrival, they fled.

Islamic primary sources

The event is also mentioned by the Muslim Scholar Ibn Sa'd in his book "Kitab al-tabaqat al-kabir", as follows:

See also
Military career of Muhammad
List of expeditions of Muhammad

References

630
Campaigns ordered by Muhammad